Celâl Nuri İleri (1881–1938) was a Turkish writer and politician, who was an important figure in the transition from a constitutional monarchy to a republic.

His mother was Nefise Hanım, the eldest daughter of the Ottoman Albanian statesman Prevezeli Abidin Pasha, who served as Adana governor, Bahr-i Sefit (Aegean Islands) governor and minister of foreign affairs.

In 2021 a book about Celal Nuri İleri was published by York Norman: Celal Nuri: young Turk modernizer and Muslim nationalist.

References

External links

1881 births
1938 deaths
Place of death missing
People from Gelibolu
Republican People's Party (Turkey) politicians
20th-century Turkish politicians
20th-century Turkish writers